Mariental is a municipality in the district of Helmstedt, in Lower Saxony, Germany. The Municipality Mariental includes the villages of Mariental-Dorf and Mariental-Horst. See also Mariental Abbey.

References

Helmstedt (district)